Gaighata Assembly constituency is an assembly constituency in North 24 Parganas district in the Indian state of West Bengal. It is reserved for scheduled castes.

Overview
As per orders of the Delimitation Commission, No. 97 Gaighata Assembly constituency (SC) is composed of the following: Gobardanga municipality, Dharmapur I, Dharmapur II, Ichapur I, Ichapur II, Jaleswar I, Shimulpur and Sutia gram panchayats of Gaighata community development block, and Bergum I, Bergum II and Machhalandpur I gram panchayats of  Habra I community development block.

Gaighata Assembly constituency (SC) is part of No. 14 Bangaon (Lok Sabha constituency) (SC). It was earlier part of Barasat (Lok Sabha constituency).

Members of Vidhan Sabha

Election results

2021
In the 2021 election, Subrata Thakur of BJP defeated his nearest rival NAROTTAM BISWAS  of AITC.

2011
In the 2011 election, Majulkrishna Thakur of Trinamool Congress defeated his nearest rival Monoj Kanti Biswas of CPI.

.# Swing calculated on Congress+Trinamool Congress vote percentages taken together in 2006.

1977-2006
In the 2006 and 2001 state assembly electionsJyotipriya Mallick of Trinamool Congress won the Gaighata assembly seat defeating Manmatha Roy of CPI(M) on both occasions. Contests in most years were multi cornered but only winners and runners are being mentioned. In 1996, Manmatha Roy of CPI(M) defeated Prabir Banerjee of Congress. In 1991, Prabir Banejee of Congress defeated Kanti Biswas of CPI(M). Kanti Biswas of CPI(M) defeated Radha Prasad Biswas of Congress in 1987, Mira Mitra of Congress in 1982, and Radha Prasad Biswas of Congress in 1977.

1967-1972
Chandi Pada Mitra of Congress won in 1972 and 1971. Parul Saha of Bangla Congress won in 1969. C.Mitra of Bangla Congress won in 1967. Prior to that the Gaighata seat was not there.

References

Assembly constituencies of West Bengal
Politics of North 24 Parganas district